The women's artistic team all-around  gymnastic event at the 2015 Pan American Games was held on July 12 at the Toronto Coliseum. This event also acted as the qualification for the all-around and event finals.

Schedule
All times are Eastern Standard Time (UTC-3).

Team Competition

Qualification results

Individual all-around
Megan Skaggs of the United States and Lorrane Oliveira of Brazil finished in 5th and 12th respectively, but did they not progress to the final because only two athletes per country can qualify for finals.

Vault

Uneven bars
Madison Desch and Megan Skaggs of the United States finished in 4th and 9th respectively, but did they not progress to the final because only two athletes per country can qualify for finals.

Balance beam
Amelia Hundley of the United States finished in 7th and Isabela Onyshko of Canada finished in 9th but did they not progress to the final because only two athletes per country can qualify for finals.

Floor

References

Gymnastics at the 2015 Pan American Games
2015 in women's gymnastics